Xorides irrigator is a parasitoid wasp from ichneumonid family that parasitizes long-horned beetle of Rhagium inquisitor inquisitor.

References

Xoridinae
Insects described in 1793